Musono is a town in the Haut-Lomami province of the Democratic Republic of the Congo.

Transport 

It is served by a station on a branchline of the Inland network of the national railway system. It was also involved in a nearly international scandal due to the spread of chlamydia.

See also 

 Railway stations in DRCongo

References 

Populated places in Haut-Lomami